The 1996/1997 season in Dutch football was the 41st professional season in the Eredivisie, with PSV Eindhoven winning the title and Roda JC claiming the Dutch National Cup.

Johan Cruijff-schaal

Eredivisie

Champions League : PSV Eindhoven
Champions League qualification : Feyenoord Rotterdam
Cup Winners Cup: Roda JC
UEFA Cup: FC Twente, Ajax Amsterdam and Vitesse Arnhem
Promotion / relegation play-offs ("Nacompetitie"): RKC Waalwijk and NEC Nijmegen
Relegated: AZ Alkmaar

Topscorers

Awards

Dutch Footballer of the Year
 1996 — Ronald de Boer (Ajax Amsterdam)
 1997 — Jaap Stam (PSV Eindhoven)

Dutch Golden Shoe Winner
 1996 — Danny Blind (Ajax Amsterdam)
 1997 — Jaap Stam (PSV Eindhoven)

PSV Winning Squad 1996-'97

Goal
 Jan-Willem van Ede
 Wilburt Need
 Ronald Waterreus

Defence
 Ernest Faber
 Niclas Jensen
 Arthur Numan
 Jaap Stam
 Stan Valckx
 Vampeta
 Chris van der Weerden

Midfield
 Wilfred Bouma
 Phillip Cocu
 Marc Degryse
 Björn van der Doelen
 Wim Jonk
 Anders Nielsen
 Boudewijn Pahlplatz
 Zeljko Petrovic
 Dennis Rommedahl
 Ovidiu Stinga
 Marciano Vink

Attack
 Gilles De Bilde
 Claudio
 René Eijkelkamp
 Marcelo
 Luc Nilis
 Boudewijn Zenden

Management
 Dick Advocaat (Coach)
 Rob Baan (Assistant)

Eerste Divisie

Promoted : MVV Maastricht
Promotion / relegation play-offs ("Nacompetitie"): Cambuur, Emmen, VVV, Zwolle, Eindhoven, Go Ahead Eagles and ADO Den Haag

Promotion and relegation

Group A

Group B

Stayed : RKC Waalwijk and NEC Nijmegen

KNVB Cup

Final

Dutch national team

References
 RSSSF Archive